Sura Kallanka (Quechua kallanka large roofed building used for celebrations during the Inca Empire, Hispanicized spelling Soracallanca) is a mountain in the Andes of Peru, about  high. It is situated in the Apurímac Region, Antabamba Province, Oropesa District. It lies southeast of Kimsaqucha, Mallmanya and Hatun Q'asa. North of Sura Kallanka there is a lake named Suraqucha (Soracocha).

References

Mountains of Peru
Mountains of Apurímac Region